The 1955 Roller Hockey World Cup was the eleventh roller hockey world cup, organized by the Fédération Internationale de Patinage a Roulettes (now under the name of Fédération Internationale de Roller Sports). It was contested by 14 national teams (13 from Europe and 1 from South America) and it is also considered the 1955 European Roller Hockey Championship (despite the presence of Chile). Each group was played in a different Italian city, with the final-eight played in the city of Milan, in Italy (officially the host city).

Group stage

Group A
All the games played in Modena, Italy

Group B
All the games played in Trieste, Italy

Group C
All the games played in Novara, Italy

Group D
All the games played in Monza, Italy

Final phase

9th to 14th play-off

All the games played in Pistoia, Italy

Final-eight

All the games played in Milan, Italy

Standings

See also
FIRS Roller Hockey World Cup
CERH European Roller Hockey Championship

External links
1955 World Cup in rink-hockey.net historical database

1955
1955 in Italian sport
World Cup,1955
World Cup,1955
Sports competitions in Milan